Château Palmer is a winery in the Margaux appellation d'origine contrôlée of the Bordeaux region of France. The wine produced here was classified as one of fourteen Troisièmes Crus (Third Growths) in the historic Bordeaux Wine Official Classification of 1855. The property is situated in the communes Margaux and Cantenac, and its wine is considered to be one of the two most popular Third Growths.

Since 1998, the Château has been producing also a second label, not a  second wine, Alter Ego de Palmer, selected from the same quality terroirs, but employing different wine-making techniques and different proportions of grapes, in order to produce an earlier-drinking wine.  Some 40% of the estate's production, is now sold as Alter Ego de Palmer. The result has been a significant reduction in the quantity of wine sold as Château Palmer (from nearly 20,000 cases before the introduction of Alter Ego de Palmer to 11,000-12,000 cases currently). The previous second wine, La Réserve de Général, is not a component of Alter Ego de Palmer, but is now sold off in bulk.

History
Once a part of the ancient estate, Château d'Issan, divided by the heirs of the Foix-Candale family in 1748, 50 hectares of vineyards came to the Gascq family. Though without association to any noble château, the wine produced became Château de Gascq, quickly established in the market and served at the court  of Versailles under Louis XV.

By 1814, the widow of the final Gascq heir, Madame Marie Bumet de Ferrière, sold the property for fr 100,000 to an Englishman, Major General Charles Palmer. Having retired from military life, Palmer invested in the property over the following years, acquiring additional land and facilities. By 1831, the domain extended 163 hectares with 82 hectares under vine, buildings in Issan, Cantenac and Margaux, and had a reputation on a par with Château Margaux and Château Beychevelle. In the early 1840s, Palmer had economic difficulties which would later affect the estate's position in the 1855 Classification, and was forced to sell the property to madame Françoise-Marie Bergerac in 1843 for fr 410,000, at a substantial loss.

From 1844, during the arrival of oidium to Bordeaux, Château Palmer was managed by an agricultural mortgage corporation, Caisse Hypothécaire de Paris, until it was sold on 1853 to the Péreire brothers, Isaac and Emile Péreire, bankers and rivals of the Rothschilds. The Péreires widely improved the estate but faced a difficult period of oidium, and by 1858 the entire vineyard had to be replanted. The architect  Burguet was commissioned to build the present château constructed on 1857-1860, and by 1870 the estate extended 177 hectares, with 109 hectares under vine. The Société Civile Péreire was formed in 1889, remaining proprietors until the poor economy following World War I and the Great Depression. Having sold off land during the preceding years, the final sale of the remaining estate took place in 1938.

A syndicate of the Sichel, Ginestet, Mialhe and Mähler-Besse families, forming the Société Civile de Château Palmer took control, the Sichel and Mähler-Besse families remaining major shareholders to date. Before World War II, Château Palmer's owners bought Château Desmirail, another Third Classified Growth, and uniquely in 1963 Palmer wines were sold under the Desmirail name.

Since 2004, Palmer has been managed by Thomas Duroux, formerly a winemaker of Tenuta Dell'Ornellaia.

Production
The vineyard area extends 55 hectares, planted 47% with Cabernet Sauvignon, 47% Merlot and 6% Petit Verdot.

The annual production of the Grand vin Château Palmer is 11,000-12,000 cases; of Alter Ego de Palmer, 7,000-8,000 cases.

Criticism & Controversy
In October 2020, Spanish seasonal workers denounced abuse in the workplace and lack of accommodation during harvest season.

References

External links 
 Château Palmer official site 

Bordeaux wine producers
Châteaux in Gironde